The Diana camera is a plastic-bodied toy camera that uses 120 roll film and 35 mm film. The camera has a simple plastic meniscus lens. Originally marketed as an inexpensive novelty gift item, the Diana has been used to specifically take soft focus, impressionistic photographs somewhat reminiscent of the Pictorialist Period of artistic photography, branded in contemporary times as Lomography.

The Diana frequently suffers from light leaks, film advance issues, and other problems. However, its low-quality plastic lens has been celebrated for its artistic effects in photographs, normally resulting in a slightly blurred composition that can provide a 'dreamlike' quality to the print.

History
The Diana first appeared during the early 1960s as an inexpensive box camera sold by the Great Wall Plastic Factory of Kowloon, Hong Kong.  Most were exported to the United States and the United Kingdom. In the United States, the Diana was imported by the Power Sales Company of Willow Grove, Pennsylvania.  During the 1960s, Power Sales Company wholesaled the Diana by the case – 144 cameras – at about 50 cents U.S. per unit to a variety of retailers and promotional merchandisers.

Most Diana cameras were given away or sold for nominal sums as novelties or prizes at fairs, carnivals, product promotions, raffles, or other events.  For a time, the camera was also regularly advertised for sale in various periodicals through mail order vendors. However, with the development of inexpensive, higher quality consumer cameras such as the Kodak Instamatic, together with the declining popularity of rollfilm, demand for the Diana – even as a novelty gift – gradually disappeared. Production of the Diana, its clones, close copies, and variants is believed to have stopped in the 1970s, though similar 35 mm box cameras were produced for many years thereafter by various companies in Hong Kong, Taiwan and China for use as promotional items.

It is currently marketed as the “Diana F+” in the original 120 format as well as "Diana Mini" in 35 mm format and the "Diana Baby 110" by Lomography. The current iteration of the medium-format Diana F+ is actually a system camera with interchangeable lenses, flashes, and film backs. Lomography also makes Diana lens adapters for several major DSLR systems, including Canon EOS, Nikon F-mount, and Micro Four Thirds.

A digital version of the camera was produced in 2014 by Greg Dash of Cyclops Cameras. The project was funded through crowdfunding platform Indiegogo, allowing Dash to produce a limited run of 1000 digital Diana cameras (a camera he called the 'Rhianna').

Characteristics and variants 

The Diana is a very simply constructed box camera with a mechanical film advance, spring-loaded shutter, and a primitive plastic viewfinder. It is constructed primarily of low-quality phenolic plastics of the type commonly found in toys imported from Asia during the 1960s. Because of wide variances in production quality, combined with a poorly designed camera body latching mechanism, Diana cameras are predisposed to light leaks onto the exposed film. If not desired, such leaks can be temporarily remedied by sealing the seams with light-proof tape after loading the film. The design of the Diana incorporates a crude lens that produces an image circle which only marginally covers the diagonal of a film frame. This marginal coverage field produces images with often pronounced vignetting. The poor quality of the plastic meniscus lens results in generally low contrast and resolution, odd color rendition, chromatic aberration, and blurred images. Additionally, the film spool may become loose or out of place when winding the film on to the next frame. Finally, the crude advance and shutter mechanism can result in images that are not properly centered or exposed.

Although these attributes are generally thought undesirable in a camera, various photographers and art photography schools have intentionally utilized these characteristics to produce photographs with interesting or artistic effects. The San Francisco Art Institute seems to have been the first school to employ the Diana in its photography program in 1967-68 as a way of stimulating creative vision without undue reliance upon camera features and technology. Later other schools picked up the idea, including Ohio University in Athens, Ohio.  The use of the Diana in this role achieved a new level of fame when the camera was utilized by American photographer (and former Ohio University photography student) Nancy Rexroth in an influential 1976 photographic exhibit and book entitled IOWA.

In addition to the 'Diana' labeled cameras, there are over fifty similar variants of the basic design, some of which may have been produced by other factories and/or manufacturers. The camera was sold under a variety of model names, often accomplished by merely affixing a different stick-on label to the same product. In other cases, slight modifications to the basic design were incorporated. Some Diana clones use a slightly different molding and plastic composition, while other models have a 'bulb' setting for time exposures. Other variants incorporate a 6×6 cm negative size (like the Diana Deluxe), while others have provision for different controls or even separate flash illumination.

A twist on the classic 1960s first version Diana, the latest Diana F+ was produced in 2007. The modern Diana F+ offers four apertures, including a pinhole. Shutter speed is often variable due to manufacturing vagaries, and can vary from 1/200th to 1/30th of a second.  As there is no shutter lock, and the shutter mechanism is always held in tension by a spring, multiple exposures with the Diana can be achieved by multiple operations of the shutter release without advancing the film. The Diana F+ can be used with the Diana Instant Back+, the Diana 35mm Back+ as well as the splitzer so as to produce a series of dreamy, radiant and lo-fi photos.

See also
Holga

Notes

External links

 Lomography's official site

120 film cameras
Hong Kong brands
Toy Cameras